Mohammad Mithun (born March 3, 1991) is a Bangladeshi cricketer. He made his first class in 2006/07 season for Sylhet Division. He plays for Sylhet Sunrisers in the Bangladesh Premier League. He made his international debut for Bangladesh in February 2014.

Domestic career 
Mithun made his first-class debut playing for Sylhet Division in November 2006. He enjoyed a good limited-overs season in 2008/09 when he topped the run charts for his team with 285 runs at an imposing strike rate of 105.

In October 2018, Mithun was named in the squad for the Rangpur Riders team, following the draft for the 2018–19 Bangladesh Premier League. In November 2019, he was selected to play for the Sylhet Thunder in the 2019–20 Bangladesh Premier League. In November 2021, he was selected to play for the Kandy Warriors following the players' draft for the 2021 Lanka Premier League.

International career 
Mithun was named as replacement of captain Mushfiqur Rahim in the two-match T20I series against Sri Lanka in February 2014 as the wicketkeeper. Mithun had been in Bangladesh cricket team's World T20 squad in 2009, making this his second inclusion in the senior team. He was then called up to the ODI squad for the three-match series against India in June 2014 and made his ODI debut and scored 26 runs.

In October 2018, Mithun was named in Bangladesh's Test squad for their series against Zimbabwe. He made his debut for Bangladesh against Zimbabwe on 11 November 2018. He became the most experienced first-class cricketer from Bangladesh to make his Test debut, with 88 matches.

In April 2019, Mithun was named in Bangladesh's 15 man squad for the 2019 Cricket World Cup.

References

External links
 

1991 births
Living people
Bangladeshi cricketers
Bangladesh Test cricketers
Bangladesh One Day International cricketers
Bangladesh Twenty20 International cricketers
Sylhet Division cricketers
Asian Games medalists in cricket
Cricketers at the 2010 Asian Games
Cricketers at the 2014 Asian Games
Asian Games gold medalists for Bangladesh
Asian Games bronze medalists for Bangladesh
Khulna Tigers cricketers
Fortune Barishal cricketers
Legends of Rupganj cricketers
Kala Bagan Krira Chakra cricketers
Bangladesh South Zone cricketers
Rangpur Riders cricketers
Khulna Division cricketers
Bangladesh under-23 cricketers
Medalists at the 2010 Asian Games
Medalists at the 2014 Asian Games
Kandahar Knights cricketers
People from Kushtia District
People from Khulna Division
South Asian Games gold medalists for Bangladesh
South Asian Games medalists in cricket
21st-century Bengalis
Wicket-keepers